is a sub-kilometer asteroid that is a near-Earth object of the Aten group.

Orbit
The orbit of  has been established with more than a 6-year observation arc. It will pass within  of Earth on 19 October 2129. For comparison, the distance to the Moon is about 0.0026 AU (384,400 km).

References

External links 
 
 
 

Minor planet object articles (unnumbered)
Earth-crossing asteroids
20071017